Greene Township is one of thirteen townships in Parke County, Indiana, United States. As of the 2010 census, its population was 423 and it contained 191 housing units.

History
The Portland Mills Bridge was listed on the National Register of Historic Places in 1978.

Geography

Unincorporated towns
 Guion at 
 Milligan at 
 Parkeville at 
(This list is based on USGS data and may include former settlements.)

Cemeteries
The township contains these nine cemeteries: Bruin, Clodfelter, Jarvis, Lane, Mount Moriah, Philadelphia, Raccoon, Seybold and Spencer.

School districts
 North Central Parke Community School Corporation

Political districts
 State House District 44
 State Senate District 38

References
 
 United States Census Bureau 2009 TIGER/Line Shapefiles
 IndianaMap

External links
 Indiana Township Association
 United Township Association of Indiana
 City-Data.com page for Greene Township

Townships in Parke County, Indiana
Townships in Indiana